Me Verás Volver (Hits & +) is a compilation album released in July, 2007 by Argentine rock band Soda Stereo. The album shares the name with their comeback tour that started on October 19 of the same year, which in turn is taken from a line in their song "En la Ciudad de la Furia". In June, 2007 the band make a media announcement for the promotion of a tour in different countries of Latin America with the purpose of celebrating ten years of their last concert, on September 20 (exactly ten years after) is carried out the only press conference of the tour, at the opening the band perform two songs: "Sobredosis de TV" and "En la Ciudad de la Furia". The album is accompanied by a pin code for the access of extra material in the band's website.

Track listing
 Sobredosis de T.V. – 4:08
 Trátame Suavemente (Melero) – 3:21
 Juego De Seducción – 3:18
 Cuando Pase el Temblor – 3:49
 Nada Personal – 4:52
 Signos – 5:15
 Persiana Americana (Cerati / Daffunchio) – 4:52
 Prófugos (Cerati / Ficicchia) – 5:17
 Pic Nic en el 4B (Bosio / Cerati / Ficicchia) – 3:39
 Corazón Delator – 5:12
 En la Ciudad de la Furia – 5:47
 De Música Ligera (Bosio/Cerati) – 3:33
 Un Millón de Años Luz (Alberti / Bosio / Cerati) – 5:04
 En Remolinos – 4:39
 Primavera 0 – 3:39
 Zona de Promesas – 3:59
 Ella Usó Mi Cabeza Como Un Revólver (Alberti / Bosio / Cerati) – 4:29
 Zoom (Alberti / Bosio / Cerati) – 3:26

All tracks written by Gustavo Cerati, except noted.

Personnel
Soda Stereo
Gustavo Cerati – lead vocals, guitars
Zeta Bosio – bass guitar, backing vocals
Charly Alberti – drums, percussion

Certifications

References

External links
 Coveralia - Me veras volver (Hits & +) - Soda Stereo

Soda Stereo albums
2007 compilation albums
Sony Music Argentina albums